Andrzej Kretek (born 27 May 1963) is a Polish football manager and former footballer.

External links
 

1963 births
Living people
People from Pabianice
Sportspeople from Łódź Voivodeship
Polish footballers
Śląsk Wrocław players
GKS Jastrzębie players
Widzew Łódź players
Raków Częstochowa players
GKS Bełchatów players
RKS Radomsko players
Polish football managers
Widzew Łódź managers
GKS Bełchatów managers
ŁKS Łódź managers
Association football goalkeepers